Boom Shaka was a pioneering South African kwaito music group consisting of Junior Sokhela, Lebo Mathosa, Theo Nhlengethwa and Thembi Seete. They released their first single "It's About Time" in 1993, and subsequently released their debut LP, titled "Kwere Kwere" in 1994. Boom Shaka is one of the most successful bands of the mid-1990s in South Africa and their music became the soundtrack for many young people in the newly democratic South Africa. Boom Shaka was able to break into the international music scene and achieve success outside of South Africa, such as in London among other places.

Boom Shaka, being one of the leading kwaito groups in South Africa, had an extreme effect on youth audiences throughout the country. Boom Shaka was purposefully put together to appeal to a youth audience by presenting a new sound and a new style. Boom Shaka were known for their distinctive sound, visual style, and dance moves, attributes that contributed to their youth appeal. Boom Shaka is known for creating popular and distinctive kwaito dance moves such as "Chop di Grass". "Chop di grass" pays homage to the men who mow the grass during the construction of highways. This dancing is said to come from traditional African dance moves, continuing to make kwaito a unique and localised South African music genre. For example, they say that their dance moves come from an urban dance of Zaire called the Kwasa Kwasa. These sexy kwaito dance moves add to their popularity. This uniqueness is propelling Boom Shaka's music in the youth radio charts and on a global level as well.1

The major presence of female vocalists in the group, specifically, the artists Lebo Mathosa and Thembi Seete have been seen as both modes of female objectification and simultaneously voices for the feminist movement. The style of dancing and dress has stirred controversy among South African listeners as it invokes a type of female sexuality that many find degrading. The artists, however, would prefer to see their music as a liberating force. This sentiment is especially reflected in their track It's About Time produced on their debut album, Boom Shaka.

Despite the group's lyrics, many listeners and observers find the discrepancy between their outside image and the message behind the words too great to reconcile.
A particularly historical example of this discrepancy came when the group performed the national anthem, Nkosi Sikelel' iAfrika at the 1998 FNB South African Music Awards. [Reactions  remained divided, as the charged lyrics paired with skimpy outfits continued to fuel the debate between liberation and degradation.

Group History

South African music producer, Don Laka set up his own record label to evolve the South African music scene beyond the genre of Bubblegum. He then put together a group, containing a DJ, Junior Sokhela, Theo Nhlengethwa, and Prophets of Da City. By manufacturing this group, an early version of Boom Shaka, Don Laka helped form the genre of kwaito.Steingo, Gavin. "South African music after Apartheid: kwaito, the "party politic," and the appropriation of gold as a sign of success" Popular Music and Society, July 2005.

Boom Shaka's leader, Junior Dread, was heavily influenced by Jamaican music through his uncle, who would play Jamaican music loudly and refuse to listen to anything else. In her article, "Mapping of Black Atlantic Performance Geographies: From Slave Ship to Ghetto, Stanley-Niaah draws parallels between Kwaito by Boom Shaka, and Jamaican danceha stating the similarities are political, musical, social, and cultural.

Boom Shaka, being the first kwaito group and with the nature of the music they created, was able to unleash amongst young black consumers an explosive desire to disengage from the long years of oppression and political protest of the apartheid era. With the seemingly apolitical nature of their music, it allowed the black youth of South Africa to no longer feel restrained by the need to comment on racial injustice and political freedom because the apartheid was over, and they no longer needed or wanted to. Gavin Steingo, "South African music after Apartheid: kwaito, the 'party politic,' and the appropriation of gold as a sign of success.

As the first kwaito group, Boom Shaka contributed greatly to the early trends within this musical style. Part of kwaito’s appeal comes from its unique dance moves which were popularised by Boom Shaka. This group created dance moves such as “Chop di grass,” a dance which was designed to honour the men who cut grass while highways are being constructed. Boom Shaka traces kwaito’s dance style back to traditional African dancing, specifically from the Kwasa Kwasa, an urban dance from in Zaire. This dance style has been seen as controversial and over sexualised by some, but it is undoubtedly a large part of kwaito's success. Kaganof, Aryan. "The Kwaito Story".

After Boom Shaka left their record label in 1998, the kwaito-oriented Kalawa Records because of controversy surrounding the creative ownership of material and disputes over their record royalties, the group sought a new recording contract that would invest in their vision and work to promote them internationally. When they could not find what they were looking for, they decided to do it themselves and signed only a one-album, 12-month publishing deal with PolyGram Records and hired their own management. In the process they have emerged as the only South African musicians outside of the country's biggest-selling artist, gospel star Rebecca Malope, to own 75% of their master recordings and 100% copyright on their new material. Boom Shaka was again ground-breaking and set a precedent in an industry that was known for taking unfair advantage of their recording artists.

Although Boom Shaka was seen as apolitical in comparison to music of the apartheid era, they were still able to stir controversy in other ways. In 1997, the group caused controversy by creating and performing a kwaito version of the South African national anthem Nkosi Sikelel' iAfrika at the South African Music Awards. Some viewed this as a prostitution of African culture for commercial purposes but the group saw it in a different way:

"It's a little bit of a misunderstanding. We're not dissing anything, this is our own version; one for the young people", said band leader Junior this week. "Our parents know the lyrics to that song, but a lot of kids don't, even though they stand at school and hear it sung every morning. Young people's reaction to our version of the song has been incredible, they love it. And this way they'll learn the lyrics too."

In addition, Lebo Mathosa’s dance routine and revealing short skirts caused often controversy and offended many who were shocked that a teenager could be so daring.

Despite their success, the group broke up after one of their lead singers, Lebo Mathosa decided to start her own solo career in 2000. She achieved great success until she was killed in a'car crash in 2006 at the age of 29.

Notes

References
"South African music after Apartheid: kwaito, the 'party politic,' and the appropriation of gold as a sign of success" http://findarticles.com/p/articles/mi_m2822/is_3_28/ai_n15648564
 Kwaito: South Africa's hip-hop?
 Hendrix would have loved it! Review of Boom Shaka's version of Nkosi.
Stanley-Niaah, Sonjah. "Mapping of Black Atlantic Performance Geographies: From Slave Ship to Ghetto." In Black Geographies and the Politics of Place, ed. by Katherine McKittrick and Clyde Woods, 193–217. Cambridge, MA: South End Press, 2007

South African musical groups
Kwaito musicians